Loverde is a surname. Notable people with the surname include:

 Dawn Brancheau née LoVerde (1969-2010), SeaWorld trainer killed by Tilikum in 2010.
Frank Loverde (1947–1990), American singer and musician
Paul Loverde (born 1940), American Roman Catholic bishop
Vincent LoVerde (born 1989), American ice hockey player